This is a list of cases before the United States Supreme Court that the Court has agreed to hear and has not yet decided.

Future argument dates are in parentheses; arguments in these cases have been scheduled, but have not, and potentially may not, take place.

October Term 2022 cases

October Term 2023 cases

See also 
 List of United States Supreme Court cases by the Roberts Court
 2022 term opinions of the Supreme Court of the United States

Notes

References 

	

Lists of United States Supreme Court cases